Statistics of Emperor's Cup in the 1954 season.

Overview
It was contested by 16 teams, and Keio BRB won the championship.

Results

1st Round
Tohoku Gakuin University 2–1 Osaka Club
Keio BRB 3–0 Kagoshima University
All Rikkyo 9–1 Takamatsu Commercial Club
All Kansai University 5–0 Toyama Soccer
Zenkyodai 3–0 Kyoto University of the Arts
Kwangaku Club 9–0 Sapporo Shukyu Club
Toyo Industries 4–0 All Yamanashi
Chuo University Club 1–1 (lottery) Nippon Light Metal

Quarterfinals
Tohoku Gakuin University 1–3 Keio BRB
All Rikkyo 0–0 (lottery) All Kansai University
Zenkyodai 1–5 Kwangaku Club
Toyo Industries 3–1 Nippon Light Metal

Semifinals
Keio BRB 1–0 All Kansai University
Kwangaku Club 1–3 Toyo Industries

Final

Keio BRB 5–3 Toyo Industries
Keio BRB won the championship.

References
 NHK

Emperor's Cup
Emperor's Cup